Blood, Bones & Baltimore is the second studio album by American folk band Sonia & Disappear Fear also known as the "Disappear Fear Orchestra" on this album. It was released on March 9, 2010 by Sonia's own Disappear Records label.  The album was recorded on November 11 and 12, 2009. The majority of which was mixed on December 16 and 17, 2009 at The Deep End Studio located in Baltimore, MD.

Track listing

Personnel
Sonia & Disappear Fear
Sonia Rutstein (SONiA) - lead vocals, guitar, harmonica
Howard Markman - lead guitar, vocals on "Biggest Baddest Heart"
Laura Cerulli - drums, vocals on "Pack of Newport" and "Biggest Baddest Heart", backing vocals
Helen Hausmann - violin, backing vocals
Michael Bowie - upright bass
Seth Kibel - tenor sax, baritone sax, flute, clarinet
Cindy Frank (CiNDY) - vocals on "Who I Am (Say Amen)"
Dylan Visvikis - backing vocals on "Who I Am (Say Amen)", piano on "Don't Make Me Wrong"
Tony Correlli - piano on "Don't Waste My Crime", engineer

References

Disappear Fear albums
2010 albums
Self-released albums